This is a list of butterflies in the U.S. state of Maryland.

Papilionidae
Eastern tiger swallowtail, Papilio glaucus
Canadian tiger swallowtail, Papilio canadensis
Zebra swallowtail, Eurytides marcellus
Pipevine swallowtail, Battus philenor
Spicebush swallowtail, Papilio troilus
Black swallowtail, Papilio polyxenes
Palamedes swallowtail, Papilio palamedes
Giant swallowtail, Papilio cresphontes

Pieridae
Cabbage white, Pieris rapae
West Virginia white, Pieris virginiensis
Checkered white, Pontia protodice
Falcate orangetip, Anthocharis midea
Olympia marble, Euchloe olympia
Clouded sulphur, Colias philodice
Orange sulphur, Colias eurytheme
Pink-edged sulphur, Colias interior
Sleepy orange, Abaeis nicippe
Little yellow, Eurema lisa
Cloudless sulphur, Phoebis sennae

Lycaenidae

Lycaenini

American copper, Lycaena phlaeas
Harvester, Feniseca tarquinius
Bog copper, Lycaena epixanthe
Bronze copper, Lycaena hyllus

Theclini & Eumaeini

Gray hairstreak, Strymon melinus
White M hairstreak, Parrhasius m-album
Banded hairstreak, Satyrium calanus
Hickory hairstreak, Satyrium caryaevorus
Edward's hairstreak, Satyrium edwardsii
King's hairstreak, Satyrium kingi
Striped hairstreak, Satyrium liparops
Northern oak hairstreak, Satyrium favonius ontario
Coral hairstreak, Satyrium titus
Red-banded hairstreak, Calycopis cecrops
Brown elfin, Callophrys augustinus
Henry's elfin, Callophrys henrici
Frosted elfin, Callophrys irus
Hoary elfin, Callophrys polios
Eastern pine elfin, Callophrys niphon
Great purple hairstreak, Atlides halesus
Juniper hairstreak, Callophrys gryneus
Hessel's hairstreak, Callophrys hesseli
Early hairstreak, Erora laeta

Polyommatini

Eastern tail-blue, Cupido comyntas
Silvery blue, Glaucopsyche lygdamus
Appalachian azure, Celastrina neglectamajor
Dusky azure, Celastrina nigra

Riodinidae
Little metalmark, Calephelis virginiensis
Northern metalmark, Calephelis borealis

Nymphalidae

Heliconiinae

Variegated fritillary, Euptoieta claudia
Greater spangled fritillary, Speyeria cybele
Aphrodite fritillary, Speyeria aphrodite
Meadow fritillary, Boloria bellona
Silver-bordered fritillary, Boloria selene

Nymphalinae

Pearl crescent, Phyciodes tharos
Phaon crescent, Phyciodes phaon
Silvery checkerspot, Chlosyne nycteis
Baltimore checkerspot, Euphydryas phaeton
Question mark, Polygonia interrogationis
Eastern comma, Polygonia comma
Gray comma, Polygonia progne
Compton tortoiseshell, Nymphalis vaualbum
Milbert's tortoiseshell, Aglais milberti
Mourning cloak, Nymphalis antiopa
Red admiral, Vanessa atalanta
American lady, Vanessa virginiensis
Painted lady, Vanessa cardui
Common buckeye, Junonia coenia
Red-spotted purple, Limenitis arthemis
Viceroy, Limenitis archippus
Hackberry emperor, Asterocampa celtis
Tawny emperor, Asterocampa clyton
American snout, Libytheana carinenta
Monarch, Danaus plexippus
Queen, Danaus gilippus

Satyrinae

Little wood-satyr, Megisto cymela
Carolina satyr, Hermeuptychia sosybius
Common wood-nymph, Cercyonis pegala
Appalachian brown, Satyrodes appalachia
Northern pearly-eye, Enodia anthedon

Hesperiidae

Pyrginae & Pyrrhopyginae

Silver-spotted skipper, Epargyreus clarus
Golden banded-skipper, Autochton cellus
Hoary Edge, Achalarus lyciades
Southern cloudywing, Thorybes bathyllus
Northern cloudywing, Thorybes pylades
Confused cloudywing, Thorybes confusis
Long-tailed skipper, Urbanus proteus
Juvenal's duskywing, Erynnis juvenalis
Horace's duskywing, Erynnis horatius
Dreamy duskywing, Erynnis icelus
Sleepy duskywing, Erynnis brizo
Wild indigo duskywing, Erynnis baptisiae
Columbine duskywing, Erynnis lucilius
Mottled duskywing, Erynnis martialis
Common checkered-skipper, Pyrgus communis
Hayhurst's scallopwing, Staphylus hayhurstii
Common sootywing, Pholisora catullus

Heteropterinae & Hesperiinae

Fiery skipper, Hylephila phyleus
Sachem, Atalopedes campestris
European skipper, Thymelicus lineola
Least skipper, Ancyloxpha numitor
Clouded skipper, Lerema accius
Swarthy skipper, Nastra lherminier
Cobweb skipper, Hesperia metea
Leonard's skipper, Hesperia leonardus
Indian skipper, Hesperia sassacus
Long dash, Polites mystic
Peck's skipper, Polites peckius
Tawny-edged skipper, Polites themistocles
Crossline skipper, Polites origenes
Black dash, Euphyes conspicua
Southern broken-dash, Wallengrenia otho
Northern broken-dash, Wallengrenia egeremet
Little glassywing, Pompeius verna
Dun skipper, Euphyes vestris
Hobomok skipper, Poanes hobomok
Zabulon skipper, Poanes zabulon
Mulberry wing, Poanes massasoit
Broad-winged skipper, Poanes viator
Aaron's skipper, Poanes aaroni
Two-spotted skipper, Euphyes bimacula
Dion skipper, Euphyes dion
Delaware skipper, Anatrytone logan
Rare skipper, Problema bulenta
Dusted skipper, Atrytonopsis hianna
Common roadside-skipper, Amblyscirtes vialis
Pepper and salt skipper, Amblyscirtes hegon
Ocola skipper, Panoquina ocola
Salt marsh skipper, Panoquina panoquin

References
 

Maryland
Butterflies